Kollam Rameswaram Mahadeva Temple  is located in the city of Kollam City in Kollam district. The presiding deity of the temple is Lord Rameswara facing west. It is believed that Kollam Rameswaram Mahadeva Temple is one of the 108 Shiva temples of Kerala and is installed by sage Parasurama dedicated to Shiva It is one of the two Rameswaram temples in 108 Shivalaya Sothram. The Amaravila Rameshwaram Sri Mahadeva Temple is the second Rameshwaram Temple. The temple is located in the village of Amaravila in Thiruvananthapuram District.

There are two small towers in the west and north sides of the temple. There is a Copper flag mast in front of Balikkal pura at west. The main sanctum sanitorium is in rectangular shape and the shrine is decorated with beautiful stone and wood carvings. Valiyambalam and Balakalpura are common in Kerala-Dravidian style.

Inscriptions
A pillar set up in the courtyard of Rameswaram temple contains a royal order of king Rama Kulasekhara, a 12th-century Chera king of Kerala. The inscription is historically significant for mentioning exact date in Kollam Era, Manavikrama Punthurakkon, the chieftain of Eranad (Calicut) and Kumara Udaya Varma, a member of the Venad Royal Family.

Subdeities
Ganesha
Subrahmanya
Dharma Sastha
Snake goddess
Rakshas
Navagraha
Krishna

See also
 108 Shiva Temples
 Temples of Kerala
 Amaravila Rameswaram Sri Mahadeva Temple
 Anandavalleeshwaram Sri Mahadevar Temple

References

108 Shiva Temples
Shiva temples in Kerala
Hindu temples in Kollam district